Rawdat Al Faras is a village in Qatar located in the municipality of Al Khor. It is best known for its research station.

Etymology
In Arabic, "rawda" is a term used to denote a depression rich in vegetation due to water and sediment run-off. The second part of the name, "faras", translates to mare, and was given because a wild mare was once found in the village.

Houbara Breeding Center
A breeding center for houbara bustards is centered in the village. It received a donation of 1,065 houbaras from a UAE government-funded organization in 2014.

Research station
Established in 1976, Rawdat Al Faras Research Station is among the oldest research stations in the country. It occupies an area of 517,000 square meters. Activities engaged in at the center include consultation services for local farms, date palm research, field surveys of local fauna, and selling and donating palm tree seeds and seedlings. The station consists of a water reservoir and two specialized facilities that dry the palm trees, extract their pollen and provide storage for their dried fruit. There 24 growing plots, of which five are palm tree plantations, two of which host over 1,200 specimens. In recent years, the station has been focused on its development of a palm atlas, which will serve as a genetic database for researchers across the GCC.

Zoo
It was reported in 2018 that a zoo would be opening in Rawdat Al Faras in the near future. Its specimens will be transferred from Al Khor Zoo.

References

Populated places in Al Khor